Nattanid Leewattanavaragul (born 16 May 1993) is a Thai racing driver currently competing in the TCR International Series and TCR Thailand Touring Car Championship. Having previously competed in the Thailand Super Series and Toyota Motorsport Trophy Thailand amongst others.

Racing career
Leewattanavaragul began her career in 2013 in the Toyota Motorsport Trophy Thailand series, finishing the season fourth in the standings. She stayed in the series for 2014, winning the Ladies Cup that year. For 2015 she switched to the Thailand Super Series, entering the Super Production C Class, Winning the class at the end of the season. In 2016 she entered the Super Production D Class of the Thailand Super Series, finishing the sixth in the championship standings. For the 2017 season she switched to the TCR Thailand Touring Car Championship, driving a SEAT León TCR for her own Morin Racing Team, she took her first victory in the series in the second race held at the Bangsaen Street Circuit.

In August 2017 it was announced that she would race in the TCR International Series, driving an SEAT León TCR for her own TCR Thailand team Morin Racing Team.

Racing record

Complete TCR International Series results
(key) (Races in bold indicate pole position) (Races in italics indicate fastest lap)

† Driver did not finish the race, but was classified as he completed over 90% of the race distance.
* Season still in progress.

References

External links
 

1993 births
Living people
TCR International Series drivers
Nattanid Leewattanavaragul
Female racing drivers
TCR Asia Series drivers
Nattanid Leewattanavaragul